was a Japanese supercentenarian who lived for 116 years and 54 days. He became the verified oldest man in history on 28 December 2012, when he surpassed the age of Christian Mortensen (1882–1998), as well as, so far, the only man who has lived to age 116.

Kimura was (after 113-year-old James Sisnett's death on 23 May 2013) the last verified surviving pre-20th century born man, and possibly the last living veteran of World War I.

Kimura became the oldest living man in Japan upon the death of Tomoji Tanabe on 19 June 2009, the world's oldest living man upon the death of Walter Breuning on 15 April 2011, the oldest living person in Japan upon the death of Chiyono Hasegawa on 2 December 2011, and the world's oldest living person, upon the death of Dina Manfredini on 17 December 2012, until his own death almost half a year later.

Early life and education
According to records, he was born on 19 April 1897 in the fishing village of Kamiukawa, Kyoto prefecture, to farmers Morizo (1858–1935) and Fusa (1867–1931) Miyake. Kimura's age was further verified by researchers in an article that they published in 2017. After thorough research, including conducting family interviews and searching official records, the authors verified Kimura's age and date of birth. Kimura's nephew Tamotsu Miyake said his uncle's birthday was 19 March, but that this had been mistakenly recorded as 19 April in 1955 when records from neighbouring towns were consolidated and redone. The researchers concluded, however, that Kimura was listed as being born on 19 March 1897 (as opposed to 19 April 1897, his likely true birth date), on his school records due to his parents' desire to have him begin school a year earlier than his later birthday would have allowed, so that he could graduate from school earlier and begin working on the family farm. During this time in Japan, schoolchildren born before April were one school year ahead of schoolchildren who were born in April or afterwards. 

In his family, Kimura was the fifth child and second surviving son of eight children, six of whom lived to adulthood and five (all except A.M. who died at age 85) became over 90 years old. He had four elder siblings including two elder sisters, Sa.M. (1887–1892) and I.M. (1889–c.1985/86) and two elder brothers, S.M. (1892–1894) and H. M. (1895–1986). He had three younger siblings: his third sister G. M. (1900–1993), his first younger brother A. M. (1902–c. 1987/88) and his youngest brother Tetsuo (1909–2007). On 1 April 1903, Kimura began his primary-school education. An intelligent student, he graduated with the equivalent of an eighth-grade education under the old imperial educational system on 31 March 1911, having had two additional years of schooling beyond what was then compulsory.

Career
On 10 April 1911, Kimura began work at the Nakahama post office as a telegraph boy while also working on his family's farm. He left the Nakahama post office on 2 February 1913. From May to December 1914, he studied at a posts and telegraph training school in Kyoto, graduating at the head of his class of 70 students and resuming work at the Nakahama post office on 4 December 1914.

Military service
On 1 April 1918, Kimura was conscripted into the Imperial Japanese Army and was posted to Nakano, Tokyo, where he served with a communications unit. He was discharged from service on 30 June, was again conscripted on 1 September 1919 and was posted to Tokyo, but only served for three weeks until 21 September. On 23 May 1920, he left the Nakahama post office for the final time. To help support his younger brother A. M. who had emigrated to Korea under Japanese rule for work and had fallen ill there, Kimura moved to Keijō (now Seoul, South Korea), taking a job on 31 May with the Government-General of Chōsen in the Mail and Telecommunications Department, with a salary of 30 yen plus a 30% overseas service allowance. He only stayed in Korea until November, however, before returning to Japan and his work on the farm. 

From 1 to 21 September 1921, Kimura underwent a final three-week period of army service, again in a communications unit, during which he was posted to Hiroshima. Around this time, he attended a ceremony in Kyoto to welcome the return to Japan of Crown Prince Hirohito from a tour of Europe. After his national service, Kimura resumed farming until 21 April 1924, when he was appointed a deputy postmaster at the Hira post office. He worked there for the next 38 years until his retirement on 30 June 1962, two months after his 65th birthday and having worked in post offices for 45 years.

Later years
After retiring, Kimura helped his eldest son run the family farm until he turned 90. In 1978, Kimura and his wife moved in with their first son and his family. Kimura's wife died the following year, and he continued to live with his first son's family and subsequently with his eldest grandson's family for the remainder of his life. On 28 September 1999, aged 102, he appeared on a local television program featuring local residents noted for their longevity. On 17 June 2002, he published an autobiographical pamphlet, “Looking back at my happy 105 years.”

Personal life
On 27 December 1920, Kimura (then still Kinjiro Miyake) married his neighbor Yae Kimura (1904–1979), the adopted daughter of Jiroemon Kimura VIII and his wife K. Kimura (1870–1939). The marriage was officially registered two days later. Since his wife's family lacked a male heir, he changed his name to Jiroemon Kimura, becoming the ninth member of the family to bear that name after his adoptive father-in-law's death in 1927. Kimura and his wife, who were married for more than 58 years, had eight children (six sons and two daughters) of whom all but their second son survived to adulthood. 

Kimura was health-conscious and active. He woke up early in the morning and read newspapers with a magnifying glass. Also, he enjoyed talking to guests and followed live parliamentary debates on television. He credited eating small portions of food (hara hachi bun me) as the key to a long and healthy life. Kimura resided in Kyōtango, Kyoto Prefecture, with his eldest son's widow, 83, and his grandson's widow, 59. On his 114th birthday on 19 April 2011, he mentioned his survival of the 7.6 magnitude 1927 Kita Tango earthquake that hit Kyoto and killed over 3,000 people. Just four days before turning 114, upon Walter Breuning's death, Kimura became the oldest living man in the world.

In October 2012, Kimura was presented with a certificate from Guinness World Records Editor-in-Chief Craig Glenday, relating to Kimura's appearance in the 2013 edition of Guinness World Records book; this was the second year in a row Kimura was recognized as the oldest living man in the world, as he also appeared in the book the year before. During the meeting, Kimura said he spent most of his time in bed. On his 116th and final birthday, Kimura received many well-wishes, including a video message from Japan's prime minister Shinzō Abe. On 23 May 2013, upon the death of Barbadian man James Sisnett (born 22 February 1900), Kimura became the last verified living man born in the 19th century.

Death
Kimura was admitted to hospital for pneumonia on 11 May 2013 and recovered temporarily. However, his health started worsening again in early June 2013, as his blood sugar level, urine production and response declined. Kimura died of natural causes in a hospital in his hometown of Kyōtango, western Japan, at 2:08 a.m. on 12 June 2013, and was succeeded as the world's oldest living man by Salustiano Sanchez (born 8 June 1901). He was survived by two daughters and three of his five sons (all except his oldest and youngest son who both died in 1998), 13 of his 14 grandchildren, 25 great-grandchildren and 15 great-great-grandchildren.

See also
 Jeanne Calment (1875–1997), the oldest woman (and the oldest person) whose age was verified
 Kane Tanaka (1903–2022), the oldest Japanese woman (and the oldest Japanese person) whose age was verified
 List of the oldest people by country
 List of the verified oldest people
 List of last surviving World War I veterans
 List of Japanese supercentenarians
 Elderly people in Japan

Notes

References

1897 births
2013 deaths
Japanese farmers
Japanese supercentenarians
World record holders
Men supercentenarians
People from Kyoto Prefecture
Postal officials
Imperial Japanese Army personnel
Military personnel of World War I
Japanese military personnel of World War I